Alphonsea is a genus of plant in the family Annonaceae.  The Plant List recognises 38 accepted species:

 Alphonsea boniana  
 Alphonsea borneensis  
 Alphonsea curtisii  
 Alphonsea cylindrica  
 Alphonsea elliptica  
 Alphonsea gaudichaudiana  
 Alphonsea glabrifolia  
 Alphonsea hainanensis  
 Alphonsea havilandii  
 Alphonsea hortensis  
 Alphonsea javanica  
 Alphonsea johorensis  
 Alphonsea keithii  
 Alphonsea kinabaluensis  
 Alphonsea kingii  
 Alphonsea lucida  
 Alphonsea lutea  
 Alphonsea madraspatana  
 Alphonsea maingayi  
 Alphonsea malayana  
 Alphonsea mollis  
 Alphonsea monogyna  
 Alphonsea orthopetala  
 Alphonsea ovata  
 Alphonsea pallida  
 Alphonsea papuasica  
 Alphonsea philastreana  
 Alphonsea sclerocarpa  
 Alphonsea sessiliflora  
 Alphonsea siamensis  
 Alphonsea sonlaensis  
 Alphonsea squamosa  
 Alphonsea stenogyna  
 Alphonsea teysmannii  
 Alphonsea tonquinensis  
 Alphonsea tsangyanensis  
 Alphonsea ventricosa  
 Alphonsea zeylanica

References

 
Annonaceae genera
Taxonomy articles created by Polbot
Taxa named by Joseph Dalton Hooker